The 1983 NCAA Division I Outdoor Track and Field Championships were contested May 30−June 4, 1983 at Robertson Stadium at the University of Houston in Houston, Texas in order to determine the individual and team national champions of men's and women's collegiate Division I outdoor track and field events in the United States. 

These were the 61st annual men's championships and the second annual women's championships. This was Houston's first time hosting the event. 

SMU and UCLA topped the men's and women's team standings, respectively; the Mustangs claimed their first team title while the Bruins' took home their second consecutive and second overall.

Team results 
 Note: Top 10 only
 (H) = Hosts

Men's title

Women's title

References

NCAA Men's Outdoor Track and Field Championship
NCAA Division I Outdoor Track and Field Championships
NCAA
NCAA Division I Outdoor Track and Field Championships
NCAA Division I Outdoor Track and Field Championships
NCAA Women's Outdoor Track and Field Championship